Gif-sur-Yvette (literally Gif on Yvette) is a commune in south-western Ile de France, France.

Geography
The town is crossed by and named after the river Yvette.

Place names
The town of Gif-sur-Yvette is composed of sections:

 in the valley: The Rougemonts, The Mérantaise, The Mairie, The Féverie, Coupières, Damiette, Courcelle, l'Abbaye, les Coudraies;
 on the Moulon Plateau: The Moulon (uninhabited, aside from a research and educational institute);
 on the Hurepoix Plateau: The Hacquinière, Belleville (created before the war) and Chevry (created in the 1970s, and equipped with infrastructure).

Also, the commune's territory includes many forests such as the Hacquinière Wood and the d'Aigrefoin Wood.

Commune's neighbors
The neighboring communes of Gif-sur-Yvette are Villiers-le-Bâcle, Saint-Aubin, Saclay, Orsay, Bures-sur-Yvette, Gometz-le-Châtel, Gometz-la-Ville, and Saint-Rémy-lès-Chevreuse.

History
The human presence on the Moulon Plateau originates in Neolithic times. Agriculture was developed, notably during the Roman era.

Between the 12th and the 18th century, an important Benedictine abbey was built in Gif.

In the 19th century, Gif remained very agricultural (in particular, operating mills).

In 1867, Gif was linked to the path of the Sceaux train (which later became the south branch of the RER B).

After the First World War, the Gif commune experienced an important demographic change.  The town took the name Gif-sur-Yvette in 1930.

Just after the Second World War, Gif-sur-Yvette acquired an international scientific reputation, with the construction of the CNRS and of the CEA.

The French Alternative Energies and Atomic Energy Commission discovered radioactive contamination in a private home in 1974.  The home had been built upon a site where needles containing radon gas were once manufactured, starting in 1915.  The needles were used to sterilize infected tissue—an idea developed by Marie Curie.

The town was extended in 1975, with the creation of the Chevry section, from areas ceded by the Gometz-la-Ville and Gometz-le-Châtel communes.

Main sights
The Saint-Rémi Church, a structure of Romanesque and Gothic architecture, was constructed in the 12th century and remained until the 15th century. It was registered as a historic monument in 1938.

Some ruins remain of a Benedictine abbey which was built in the 12th century and became a national property in 1789.  It was officially registered in 1963.

Population

Inhabitants of Gif-sur-Yvette are known as Giffois.

Economy
Gif-sur-Yvette is situated in the "Science Valley" of the Yvette River. Numerous research organizations exist in this area, such as the CNRS (Centre National de la Recherche Scientifique), the CEA (Commissariat à l'Énergie Atomique), Supélec (École Supérieure d'Électricité), the LGEP (Laboratoire de Génie Électrique de Paris, associated with Supélec), SOLEIL Synchrotron (Source Optimisée de Lumière d'Energie Intermediaire du LURE) and the Institute of Plant Biotechnology. Also, Gif is home to the Centre National d'Études and of the National Police Academy.

The CGT operates, since 1950, a permanent central college of Gif-sur-Yvette, the Benoît Frachon Center, situated along the Yvette River.

Transport
Gif-sur-Yvette is served by two stations on Paris RER line B: Gif-sur-Yvette and Courcelle-sur-Yvette.
Like all the train stations on this line, one train goes towards/past Paris (Aéroport Charles de Gaulle 2 TGV or Mitry-Claye) and the other goes towards the other end of the line : Saint-Rémy-lès-Chevreuse.
The trains arrive generally at 15-minute intervals.

People
 Louis Sédilot (1599-1672), early Quebec colonist
 Juliette Adam (1836–1936), founder of the Nouvelle Revue (1879) and operator of a famous literary club during the Third Republic.
 The Duke and Duchess of Windsor's former country home, Le Moulin de la Tuilerie, a sprawling dwelling created from an old mill and a number of barns, is located on the outskirts of town. The couple bought the buildings in 1952 from the artist Drian and were weekend residents for some 20 years.  It was the only home they owned together.  It has been restored as three individual holiday homes which are available to rent through the Landmark Trust and Owners Direct in the UK. Among the Windsors' famous guests at the house were Richard Burton and Elizabeth Taylor, Cecil Beaton and Marlene Dietrich.
 The artist Fernand Léger died on 17 August 1955 in the house where, in 1972, negotiations were held between Henry Kissinger and Le Duc Tho which led to the end of the Vietnam War.
 The actor Richard Bohringer lives in the town. His daughter, actress Romane Bohringer pursued her university studies here.
 The actress and super-model Noémie Lenoir is from Gif-sur-Yvette, in the l'Abbaye section.
 Well-known British chemists who have been working at the Institut de Chimie des Substances Naturelles at Gif include: Derek Barton, Hugh Felkin, Bob Crabtree and Steve Davies.
 The famous astrophysicist Hubert Reeves lived in La Hacquinière.

Twin towns
 Olpe, Germany, since 2001

See also
Communes of the Essonne department

References

External links

 Official website
Mayors of Essonne Association 

Communes of Essonne